Connecticut's 26th Senate district elects one member of the Connecticut Senate. The district consists of the entirety of Westport, Wilton, Ridgefield, and Redding, and parts of Bethel, New Canaan and Weston. Previously, the 26th district comprised Norwalk, Wilton, New Canaan, and Easton. However, in the late 1970s Norwalk and Darien became the 25th district.

Its current senator is Democrat Ceci Maher.

Senators from 1905 to the present 
At some point shortly prior to 1905, Connecticut was redistricted. Fairfield County was previously represented in the 12th Senate District.

Recent Election Results

2022

2020

2018

See also 
 Connecticut's 12th Senate district
 Connecticut's 25th Senate district
 History of Norwalk, Connecticut
 History of Wilton, Connecticut
 List of mayors of Norwalk, Connecticut

References

26
History of Fairfield County, Connecticut
History of Norwalk, Connecticut